Circle is the fifth studio album by the Japanese girl idol girl group Onyanko Club. It was released in Japan on August 5, 1987.
It is the only album from the group released by Kirigirisu Records, a label established for the group and owned jointly by Canyon Records, For Life Records, CBS/Sony Records and EPIC/Sony Records.

Track listing

Charts

Weekly charts

References 

Onyanko Club albums
1987 albums
Pony Canyon albums